The 2017–18 Liga Națională season is the 68th season of the Liga Națională, the highest professional basketball league in Romania. Sepsi SIC Sfântu Gheorghe is the defending champion.

Competition format
The Romanian Basketball Federation agreed a change in the competition format for the 2017–18 season:

 10 teams played the regular season, consisting in a double-legged round robin format.
 At the end of the regular season, teams are split into two groups, one of them composed by the first six teams and the other one by the rest. In this second stage all points of the regular season are counted and the teams will face each other from its group twice.
 All teams from the group from 1st to 6th and the two first qualified teams from the bottom group will join the playoffs. In this knockout stage, quarterfinals and semifinals will be played with a best-of-three-games format and the final with a best-of-five one.

Teams
CSM Târgoviște and Politehnica Iași withdrew from the competition and enrolled in the Liga I.

SCM Timișoara and CSU Alba Iulia were promoted from the previous season of the Liga I.

Regular season

Play-offs
The higher seeded teams played games 1, 2 and 5 at home.

References

External links
Official site of the Romanian Basketball Federation
Halfcourt.info (Romanian and English)
Numaibaschet.ro (Romanian)
Baschetromania.ro (Romanian)

2017-18
ROU
Basketball